Peshawari turban, also Peshawari patke or Peshawari lungee, is the traditional turban worn in Peshawar and its surrounding regions. 

It is a two-piece headgear. One piece is a dome-shaped hard cap or kulla, generally embroidered with golden thread.  The other is called lungi which consists of a long and narrow piece of cotton cloth (not to be confused with a waist cloth wrapped in some regions). It has a fan-shaped turra (crest) and a tail termed shamla.

Subhas Chandra Bose had used a Peshawari turban to disguise himself as a Pashtun in 1941 to flee from the British territory.

During the British rule a similar turban was part of the dress for some government peons.

Gandhara turban gallery from major museums (1st-3rd century CE)

See also
 Peshawari chappal
 Pagri (turban)
 Puneri Pagadi
 Turban
 Rasam Pagri

References

Turbans
Pakistani headgear
Peshawar
Pashtun culture